

Demographics
 India census, Balganur had a population of 11942 with 5948 males and 5994 females.

See also
Maski
Sindhanur
Raichur
 Olaballari
 Districts of Karnataka

References

External links

 Raichur District Website | The Cotton Bowl of Karnataka | India

 Cities and towns in Raichur district